Kalven is a mountain in Lom Municipality in Innlandet county, Norway. The mountain lies in the Smørstabbtindene mountains and it is surrounded by several other notable mountains including Gravdalstinden to the south; Storebjørn and Stetinden to the southeast; Veslebjørn to the east; and Sokse, Kviven, and Store Smørstabbtinden to the northeast. The mountain peak is surrounded by a glacier.

See also
List of mountains of Norway by height

References

Jotunheimen
Lom, Norway
Mountains of Innlandet